Henderson State University (HSU) is a public university in Arkadelphia, Arkansas. Founded in 1890 as Arkadelphia Methodist College, it is Arkansas's only member of the Council of Public Liberal Arts Colleges. Henderson has an undergraduate enrollment of around 2,500 students.

History 

The university was renamed for Charles Christopher Henderson, a Trustee and prominent Arkadelphia businessman, on May 23, 1904.

Glen Jones years & subsequent financial crisis
Glendell Jones Jr. was named Henderson State University's 17th president on Tuesday, March 6, 2012 and officially assumed presidential duties on July 1, 2012. Jones' tenure as president was rocked by a series of scandals and bad publicity, and he and his senior leadership were twice the subject of no-confidence votes by the faculty ignored by the university's Board of Trustees, chaired by Bruce Moore of Little Rock, AR. When the true scope of the university's budget crisis became public in July 2019, Jones was asked to resign--he was compensated with a year's further salary and six months free residence at the university's presidential mansion. He currently serves as an adviser to the president of Georgetown University.

Jones—as well as several other current and former administrators, staff, and members of the Board of Trustees—were called to testify before the Arkansas legislature in 2020 as part of the state's effort to understand the university's staggering financial collapse.  

Following Jones' resignation, then-general counsel Elaine Kneebone was named acting president. She was replaced by (Interim) President/Chancellor Jim Borsig, who resigned in early 2021 citing health concerns. Chuck Ambrose was hired in November 2021 as the first permanent head of the institution in over two years.

On October 24, 2019, the Henderson State Board of Trustees voted unanimously to join the Arkansas State University System based in Little Rock, Arkansas.

In February 2022, the university, claiming a pending cash shortfall of over $12 million, declared financial exigency and announced plans to begin cuts to personnel and programs in an effort to "right-size" the university and avert the university's closure.  

On May 2, 2022, 37% of faculty received phone calls from the Chancellor's office that their positions had been terminated, 12 departments were excised entirely, eliminating many degree programs. The university cut 67 faculty positions, of which 44 were tenured. Students and faculty protested the sweeping changes, and on May 4, the Faculty Senate voted no confidence in the administration.  On May 5, the ASUS Board dismissed the vote of no confidence and approved Chancellor Ambrose's recommendations for program and faculty cuts.

2019 campus methamphetamine synthesis incident 
In October 2019, police responded to a campus chemistry laboratory at the Reynolds Science Center following concerns of chemical odors resulting in the building's closure for several weeks. Initial investigation found elevated levels of benzyl chloride and subsequently found methamphetamine residues. Two chemistry professors who were described as having been acting awkwardly were arrested and charged with manufacturing methamphetamine.

Athletics 

Henderson State's athletic teams are the Reddies. The university is a member in the Division II level of the National Collegiate Athletic Association (NCAA), primarily competing in the Great American Conference since the 2011–12 academic year. The Reddies previously competed in the Gulf South Conference (GSC) from 1993–94 to 2010–11; as well as the defunct Arkansas Intercollegiate Conference (AIC) of the National Association of Intercollegiate Athletics (NAIA) from 1930–31 to 1992–93.

Henderson State sponsors in 12 intercollegiate sports: Men's sports include baseball, basketball, football, golf and swimming & diving; while women's sports include basketball, cross country, golf, softball, swimming & diving, tennis and volleyball. The university also has a co-ed cheer and pom squad.

Football 

The university's football team's home games are played at Carpenter-Haygood Stadium in Arkadelphia. Henderson State shares the longest rivalry in Division II football with Ouachita Baptist University Tigers, the Battle of the Ravine, which began in 1895. Gus Malzahn, who played wide receiver for the Reddies, is one of their most famous alumni.

Notable alumni 

 Bobby Bones, host of the nationally syndicated radio show Bobby Bones Show
 Lloyd L. Burke 1950, Medal of Honor recipient
 Osro Cobb, Republican politician and lawyer
 Ken Duke, professional golfer
 Bob Fisher, past president of Belmont University.
 Roy Green, 1979, former American football wide receiver in the National Football League
 Tony Johns, Canadian football player
 Gus Malzahn, 1990, American football coach and former head football coach of Auburn University. Current head coach at University of Central Florida
 John P. McConnell, 1927, General and Chief of Staff, United States Air Force
 Sean McGrath, 2012, current American football tight end in the National Football League
 Sid McMath, 34th governor of Arkansas (1949-1953)
 David Pryor, 39th governor of Arkansas (1975–1979), US Senator (1979–1997), and US Representative from Arkansas's 4th district (1966–1973)
 Aaron Owens, 1999, former AND1 Mixtape Tour basketball player
 Reggie Ritter, 1982, former Major League baseball player for the Cleveland Indians and the only HSU graduate to play in the Major Leagues.
 Jane Ross, co-founder of the Ross Foundation
 Jimmy D. Ross, 1958, 4-star General and member of the board of two corporations, United States Army
 G. Lloyd Spencer, U.S. Senator from Arkansas
 Robert Thomas, former professional football player for the Dallas Cowboys
 Billy Bob Thornton, (attended), Academy Award-winning American screenwriter, actor as well as occasional director, playwright and singer.
 Delores White, All-American Girls Professional Baseball League baseball player
 Jeremy Williams, American player of Canadian football
 C. Vann Woodward, 1959, Sterling Professor of History at Yale University; Pulitzer Prize-winning historian

References

External links 

 
 Official athletics website

 
Liberal arts colleges in Arkansas
Public liberal arts colleges in the United States
Educational institutions established in 1890
Buildings and structures in Arkadelphia, Arkansas
Education in Clark County, Arkansas
1890 establishments in Arkansas
Public universities and colleges in Arkansas
Arkansas State University System campuses